Harold Antonio Landry III (born June 5, 1996) is an American football outside linebacker for the Tennessee Titans of the National Football League (NFL). He played college football at Boston College and was drafted by the Titans in the second round of the 2018 NFL Draft.

Early life
Landry was born in Spring Lake, North Carolina to Doreen and Harold Landry on June 5, 1996. Landry attended Pine Forest High School in Fayetteville, North Carolina. As a senior, he had 96 tackles and 17 sacks. He committed to Boston College to play college football.

College career
As a true freshman at Boston College in 2014, Landry appeared in all 13 games, recording 11 tackles. As a sophomore he appeared in 12 games with 11 starts and had 60 tackles and 4.5 sacks. As a junior in 2016, Landry led the nation and set a Boston College record with 16.5 sacks. He returned to Boston College for his senior year, rather than enter the 2017 NFL Draft.  Landry was invited to the Senior Bowl, but opted not to attend due to a lingering ankle injury.

Collegiate statistics

Professional career
Landry participated in the NFL Combine on March 4, 2018.  Prior to the NFL Draft, Landry was a popular mock draft pick for the Green Bay Packers, Detroit Lions and Tennessee Titans.

Landry was drafted by the Tennessee Titans in the second round (41st overall) of the 2018 NFL Draft.

2018 season: Rookie year

Landry signed his rookie contract on June 14, 2018. He made his NFL debut in Week 2 of the 2018 season against the Houston Texans. During Week 4 against the Philadelphia Eagles, Landry recorded his first NFL sack on Carson Wentz. He finished the 26-23 overtime victory with four tackles, a sack, and a forced fumble. During Week 9 against the Dallas Cowboys, Landry sacked Dak Prescott once in the 28-14 road victory. Landry recorded a sack in each of the final two games of the season.

Landry finished his rookie season with 4.5 sacks, 44 tackles, two pass deflections, and a forced fumble.

2019 season
During Week 4 against the Atlanta Falcons, Landry sacked Matt Ryan twice in the 24-10 road victory. During Week 8 against the Tampa Bay Buccaneers, he recorded a strip sack on Jameis Winston and recovered the ball in a 27-23 victory. In the next game against the Carolina Panthers, Landry recorded his first NFL interception by picking off Kyle Allen in the 30-20 road loss.

Landry finished his second professional season with a then-career-high nine sacks along with 68 tackles, a forced fumble, two fumble recoveries, an interception, and a pass deflection. In the Divisional Round against the Baltimore Ravens, Landry sacked Lamar Jackson once in the 28-12 road victory.

2020 season
During Week 2 against the Jacksonville Jaguars, Landry intercepted his first pass of the season off a pass thrown by Gardner Minshew late in the fourth quarter to secure a 33–30 victory for the Titans. Three weeks later against the Buffalo Bills, Landry recorded his first sack of the season by spinning down Josh Allen in the 42–16 victory. During a Week 9 24-17 victory over the Chicago Bears, Landry recorded four tackles and a sack. Two weeks later against the Baltimore Ravens, he recorded seven tackles and a sack in the 30-24 overtime road victory. In the next game against the Indianapolis Colts, Landry recorded another sack in the 45-26 road victory. In the regular-season finale against the Houston Texans, he recorded four tackles and a sack in the 41-38 road victory.

Landry finished the 2020 season with 5.5 sacks, a then-career-high 69 tackles, an interception, and a career-high five pass deflections. In the Wild Card round of the playoffs against the Ravens, Landry led the team with 10 tackles (8 solo) and sacked Lamar Jackson twice during the 20–13 loss.

2021 season

During the season-opener against the Arizona Cardinals, Landry recorded three tackles and sacked Kyler Murray once in the 38-13 loss. Three weeks later, Landry recorded seven tackles and a sack in a 27-24 overtime road loss to the New York Jets. In the next game against the Jacksonville Jaguars, he recorded seven tackles and sacked rookie quarterback Trevor Lawrence twice in the 37-19 road victory. The following week against the Buffalo Bills, Landry recorded eight tackles and sacked Josh Allen twice in the narrow 34–31 victory. During a Week 8 34-31 overtime road victory over the Indianapolis Colts, Landry recorded five tackles, a sack, and a forced fumble. Two weeks later, he recorded five tackles and a sack in a 23-21 victory over the New Orleans Saints. During a Week 14 20-0 shutout victory over the Jaguars, Landry recorded three tackles and a sack. Three weeks later against the Miami Dolphins, he recorded three tackles and a sack in the 34-3 victory.

Landry finished the 2021 season with a career-high 12 sacks, a career-high 74 tackles, and a forced fumble. The Titans finished atop the AFC with a 12-5 record and earned a first-round bye in the playoffs. In the Divisional Round round of the playoffs against the Cincinnati Bengals, Landry had six tackles and 1.5 sacks in the 19–16 loss. On January 26, 2022, Landry was selected to appear in the 2022 Pro Bowl as an injury replacement. It marked his first career Pro Bowl.

2022 season
On March 8, 2022, Landry signed a five-year, $87.5 million extension with $52.5 million guaranteed. On August 31, 2022, Landry tore his ACL in practice, prematurely ending his season. He was placed on injured reserve two days later.

NFL career statistics

Regular season

Postseason

Personal life
Landry and his wife, Danielle, have two sons: Greyson and Ollie. He and Greyson share the same June 5 birthday.

References

External links

Boston College Eagles bio
Tennessee Titans bio

1996 births
Living people
People from Spring Lake, North Carolina
Players of American football from North Carolina
American football defensive ends
Boston College Eagles football players
Tennessee Titans players
American Conference Pro Bowl players